The Catherine Park is the large landscaped area to the south of the Catherine Palace, located in the town of Tsarskoye Selo (Pushkin), 25 km south-east of St. Petersburg, Russia.

The park has two parts: a formal 18th century Dutch-style garden and a natural English garden.

Formal Dutch garden 
The formal garden was laid out in 1720 by masters of Dutch landscape gardening on three parterres in front of the Imperial Palace. At the same time, a  reflecting pool was constructed on the third parterre, and two ponds were made on the Vangazi creek flowing from the hill: the Upper (Large) and Mill ponds (later included in the cascade of Lower ponds).

The main features in this garden are the Upper bath, Lower bath, Hermitage, Cave, Hermitage Kitchen, Moreyskaya column, Vorota gate, and Orlov gate.

English garden 
The main features of the English park are: the Dutch-style boathouse the Dutch Admiralty, Hall on the Island pavilion, Chesme Column, Marble Bridge, Turkish bath, the Pyramid, Red Cascade, Gothic Gate, Ruin Tower, Orlovsky gate, Granite terrace, "Girl with a Jug" fountain, Concert Hall, Catherine Palace kitchen ruins, Creaky Summer House, Evening Hall, Kagul Obelisk, and Private Garden.

Gallery

References

Detailed description and history from Tsarskoe Selo in 1910

External links

Official website

Rococo architecture in Russia
Catherine the Great
Cultural heritage monuments of federal significance in Saint Petersburg